The Patterson School was a private, non-profit, co-educational, non-denominational, multi-cultural boarding and day school for grades seven through twelve, and one year of post-secondary study, located in Lenoir, North Carolina.  The school opened in 1909 under the auspices of Samuel L. Patterson, the school's namesake and the first elected agricultural commissioner for the state of North Carolina.

Patterson was most noted for its successful athletic program during the 2000s, particularly in men's basketball. Citing financial concerns, the school closed its doors in 2009, and the facility was leased to the Caldwell County Schools system in 2012.

Notable former athletes
 Tony Crocker, international basketball player and TBL All-Star
 Courtney Fortson, professional basketball player and CBA Most Valuable Player in 2018
 Jeremy Hazell, international basketball player and French League All-Star
 Jordan Hill, former 1st round NBA draft pick in 2009, selected by the New York Knicks
 Ahmad Ibrahim, played in the Lebanese Basketball League
 Davon Jefferson, played in the LBA, plays in the Israeli Basketball Premier League
 DeAndre Kane, played in the Israeli Premier League and EuroLeague
 Arsalan Kazemi, played in the IBSL
 Angel McCoughtry, WNBA player for the Atlanta Dream
 Jamar Samuels, basketball player for Bnei Herzliya of the Israeli Basketball Premier League
 Dominique Sutton, professional basketball player
 Hassan Whiteside, NBA player for the Portland Trail Blazers

References

Schools in Caldwell County, North Carolina
Defunct schools in North Carolina
Educational institutions established in 1909
Educational institutions disestablished in 2009
1909 establishments in North Carolina